Sadorus is a village in Champaign County, Illinois, United States. The population was 402 at the 2020 census. Sadorus was the first town founded in Champaign County.

Geography
Sadorus is located at  (39.966397, -88.345247).

History

Settlement 

Sadorus was settled in April 1824 by Henry Sadorus, and was the first town founded in Champaign County.

Train wreck 

There was a train wreck as a train was passing through the town on February 21, 2011. Two grain cars tipped over and another 3 or 4 cars derailed into a nearby field. The train had already passed through the residential area of the town when it derailed, and so luckily, nobody was injured. It is believed that soggy soil underneath the tracks caused the derailment.

Demographics

As of the 2020 census there were 402 people, 156 households, and 88 families residing in the village. The racial makeup of the village was 88.56% White, 1.49% Native American, 0.25% from other races, and 9.70% from two or more races. Hispanic or Latino of any race were 2.24% of the population.

There were 156 households, out of which 36.54% had children under the age of 18 living with them, 36.54% were married couples living together, 10.26% had a female householder with no husband present, and 43.59% were non-families. 30.77% of all households were made up of individuals, and 24.36% had someone living alone who was 65 years of age or older. The average household size was 2.92 and the average family size was 2.29.

The village's age distribution consisted of 18.5% under the age of 18, 3.4% from 18 to 24, 17.9% from 25 to 44, 31.4% from 45 to 64, and 28.9% who were 65 years of age or older. The median age was 53.6 years. For every 100 females, there were 123.1 males. For every 100 females age 18 and over, there were 120.5 males.

The median income for a household in the village was $49,500, and the median income for a family was $78,750. Males had a median income of $42,500 versus $20,000 for females. The per capita income for the village was $29,109. About 3.4% of families and 6.2% of the population were below the poverty line, including 13.6% of those under age 18 and none of those age 65 or over.

Notable landmarks 
Sadorus Rock is a large rock that was in a local field. The rock was moved from the field to in front of the Sadorus Park around 2003. Formally known as "Pioneer Rock", it was renamed "Sadorus Rock" and dedicated to Henry Sadorus on October 30, 1932. It is believed that the large rock wound up in the relatively un-rocky fields of Champaign county sometime during the end of the last ice age when melting glaciers deposited the rock in the area.

Notable places 
The National Museum of Ship Models and Sea History, a non-profit museum that opened in 2001, features ship models and rare maritime texts.

Notable people 

 Jennie Garth, actress starring in Beverly Hills, 90210 and What I Like About You (TV series)
 Dorothy Schroeder, AAGPBL All-star player and all-time league leader in RBIs and walks; in the National Baseball Hall of Fame and Museum

References

Villages in Champaign County, Illinois
Villages in Illinois